Tara Ison (born 1964) is an American novelist, short story writer, and essayist.

She is the author of three novels: Rockaway (Soft Skull Press, 2013), The List (Scribner, 2007), and A Child out of Alcatraz (Faber & Faber, 1997), which was a Finalist for the Los Angeles Times Book Prize. A collection of essays, Reeling Through Life: How I Learned To Live, Love & Die at the Movies, was published by Soft Skull Press in January 2015, and was the winner of the 2015 PEN Southwest Award for Creative Nonfiction. Her short story collection, Ball, was published by Soft Skull Press in Fall 2015. She received a National Endowment for the Arts Fellowship in 2020 in support of a short story collection tentatively titled "The Meat Bee," after her 2018 story published in Tin House.

Work 
Ison received her MFA in Fiction & Literature from Bennington College, where she was a student of Rick Moody. Institutions she has taught creative writing and screenwriting at include Washington University in St. Louis, Northwestern University, Ohio State University, Goddard College and Antioch University Los Angeles. In addition, she has taught UC Riverside Palm Desert's MFA in Creative Writing program. Presently, she is a Professor of English at Arizona State University.

Work by Ison has appeared in Tin House, Salon, O, The Oprah Magazine, Electric Literature, The Kenyon Review, The Rumpus, Nerve, Black Clock, TriQuarterly, The Santa Monica Review, PMS: poemmemoirstory, Publishers Weekly, The Week, The Mississippi Review, LA Weekly, the Los Angeles Times, the San Francisco Chronicle, the Chicago Tribune, the San Jose Mercury News, and numerous anthologies.

She is also the co-writer, with Neil Landau, of the 1991 cult classic movie Don't Tell Mom the Babysitter's Dead. The pair had originally written the script in 1987.

Awards and honors
Ison is the recipient of National Endowment for the Arts Creative Writing Fellowships in 2020 and 2008, and a 2008 COLA Individual Artist Grant, as well as multiple Yaddo fellowships, a Rotary Foundation Scholarship for International Study, a Brandeis National Women's Committee Award, a Thurber House Fiction Writer-in-Residence Fellowship, the Simon Blattner Fellowship from Northwestern University, and a California Arts Council Artists' Fellowship Award.

Books 

 Ball: Stories
 Reeling Through Life: How I Learned to Live, Love, and Die at the Movies''' Winner, 2015 PEN Southwest Award for Creative Nonfiction
 A Child out of Alcatraz The List RockawayScreenwriting
Television
 Doogie Howser, M.D. (1990)
 Ace Ventura: Pet Detective (1996)
Film
 Don’t Tell Mom the Babysitter’s Dead'' (1991)

References

External links 
 

20th-century American novelists
21st-century American novelists
American women novelists
American women short story writers
Living people
Bennington College alumni
Washington University in St. Louis faculty
Northwestern University faculty
Ohio State University faculty
Goddard College faculty
Antioch University faculty
University of California, Riverside faculty
Arizona State University faculty
American women essayists
20th-century American women writers
21st-century American women writers
20th-century American short story writers
21st-century American short story writers
20th-century American essayists
21st-century American essayists
Novelists from Illinois
Novelists from Ohio
Novelists from Missouri
Novelists from Arizona
Novelists from Vermont
1964 births